The Kirtonryggen Formation is a geologic formation in Norway. It preserves fossils.

See also

 List of fossiliferous stratigraphic units in Norway

References
 

Geologic formations of Norway
Geology of Svalbard
Ordovician System of Europe
Ordovician Norway
Ordovician south paleopolar deposits